The 1982 Massachusetts gubernatorial election was held on November 2, 1982. Michael Dukakis was elected to a second non-consecutive term. He beat Republican John W. Sears in the General election, after defeating Incumbent Governor Edward J. King in the Democratic primary.

This election notably saw the Dukakis-Kerry ticket for Governor and Lt. Governor, a gubernatorial ticket made up of the future 1988 and 2004 Democratic nominees for President of the United States, who both lost to a  Bush family member, George H.W. and George W. respectively. Republican candidate Andrew Card also went on to serve in key roles in both Bush administrations; as White House Deputy Chief of Staff, Transportation Secretary, and White House Chief of Staff.

Democratic primary

Governor

Candidates
Michael Dukakis, former Governor
Edward J. King, incumbent Governor

Withdrew
Thomas P. O'Neill III, incumbent Lieutenant Governor

Campaign
Former Governor Michael Dukakis challenged incumbent Governor Edward J. King in a rematch of the 1978 Democratic primary. This time, Dukakis was victorious 53–47%.

Results

Lt. Governor

Candidates
 John Kerry, veteran and anti-war activist
 Evelyn Murphy, Chair of the National Advisory Committee on Oceans and Atmosphere and former State Secretary of Economic Affairs
 Lou Nickinello, State Representative from Natick
 Lois Pines, former State Representative from Newton
 Samuel Rotondi, State Senator from Winchester

Campaign 
Incumbent Lt. Governor Thomas P. O'Neill III did not run for re-election. Former Navy Lieutenant and anti-war activist John Kerry won a five way contest for the Democratic nomination.

Results

Republican primary

Governor

Candidates
 Andrew Card, State Representative from Holbrook
 John Lakian, businessman
 John Winthrop Sears, former Suffolk County Sheriff and Boston City Councilman

Results

Lt. Governor

Candidates
 Leon Lombardi, State Representative from Easton

Results
Lombardi was unopposed for the Republican nomination.

General election

Results
Michael Dukakis won the election with 57.9% of the vote, winning every county in the state - 13 with a majority, and 1 county (Barnstable) with a plurality.

Results by county

See also
 1981–1982 Massachusetts legislature

References

Gubernatorial
1982
Massachusetts
Michael Dukakis